Edward James Milne (18 October 1915 – 23 March 1983) was a British Labour politician, who was elected as independent candidate after deselection by his party.

He succeeded Alfred Robens as MP for Blyth, later known as Blyth Valley, in a 1960 by-election. Robens was unexpectedly and somewhat controversially elevated to the chairmanship of the National Coal Board, and Milne, a trades union official, was selected by the local Constituency Labour Party and with the support of the shopworkers union, USDAW.

During his Parliamentary career, Milne became increasingly concerned about problems of endemic corruption within local government in the north east of England. These were eventually revealed in the Poulson Affair involving corruption leading Labour movement figures Andrew Cunningham and T. Dan Smith. Known as a difficult man to get on with, Milne's problems were not restricted to his opponents in the local Labour Party; he twice unsuccessfully reported a local journalist, Jim Harland, to the Press Council over articles he had written.

By 1974 the breach between Milne and the local party was irreparable, and he was deselected on the eve of the February 1974 general election. Milne had already made preparations for this eventuality and ran a campaign as an Independent Labour candidate. He overturned the Labour majority and defeated Ivor Richard, who had the official endorsement, by 6,140 votes.
However, it was a short-lived victory, as Milne was narrowly defeated in the October 1974 general election by John Ryman by 78 votes.
Milne's supporters who won seats on the local authority had all been defeated by 1979; when Milne stood again in the 1979 general election he lost by over 7,000 votes.

Aspect of Milne's life are heavily mirrored by the character Eddie Wells, in Peter Flannery's 1996 television serial Our Friends In The North, particularly his fight against corruption in local government, and his election as an Independent Labour MP in 1974.

Milne wrote a book entitled No Shining Armour (1976) detailing his travails with the local party, and giving his view on the corruption scandals of the 1970s. It attracted 36 libel writs, and the costs and damages associated with it came close to bankrupting his publishers.

References

1915 births
1983 deaths
Labour Party (UK) MPs for English constituencies
Independent politicians in England
Independent members of the House of Commons of the United Kingdom
UK MPs 1959–1964
UK MPs 1964–1966
UK MPs 1966–1970
UK MPs 1970–1974
UK MPs 1974